Pleasant Township is a township in Hardin County, Iowa, USA.

History
Pleasant Township was organized in 1854.

References

Townships in Hardin County, Iowa
Townships in Iowa
1854 establishments in Iowa